The Blessed Ones is a 1986 Swedish drama film directed by Ingmar Bergman, starring Harriet Andersson and Per Myrberg. The screenplay was adapted by Ulla Isaksson from her own novel with the same title. The film tells the story of a couple in which the woman becomes delusional and loses her mind. It was the third time Bergman directed a film written by Isaksson, after Brink of Life and The Virgin Spring. The Blessed Ones was produced by Sveriges Television and premiered on TV2 on 19 February 1986. The American premiere was on 21 February 1987 at the Museum of Broadcasting in New York City.

Plot
Sune, a theology student who has dropped out and is also the son of a priest, meets Viveka in a church. The two connect via a theological discussion and eventually get married. As the years pass, Viveka grows more and more emotionally unstable due to jealousy and religious anxiety. Sune accepts Viveka's mental problems and, instead of seeking help for his wife, obeys her increasingly bizarre commands. Eventually Viveka loses her mind completely, locks herself in the couple's apartment while Sune is away, and tries to make neighbours and the police believe that Sune is trying to murder her with a knife. When Sune arrives home Viveka is taken away to a hospital. Sune tries to convince the doctors that Viveka is not insane and should be allowed to leave. In the end, Sune turns on a gas tap and lies down next to Viveka so they will die together.

Cast
 Harriet Andersson as Viveka Burman
 Per Myrberg as Sune Burman
 Christina Schollin as Annika
 Lasse Pöysti as doctor Dettow
 Irma Christenson as Mrs. Storm
 Björn Gustafson as a neighbour

References

External links
 
 

1986 drama films
1986 films
Films based on Swedish novels
Films directed by Ingmar Bergman
Swedish drama films
Swedish television films
1980s Swedish-language films
1980s Swedish films